Brežđe is a village in the Mionica municipality, Kolubara District in Serbia.

Šalitrena Cave 

Šalitrena Cave is located in the village area, in the gorge of the Ribnica river. The name means "Saltpeter Cave" in Serbian.

It is the richest Paleolithic find of the central and west Balkan Peninsula, a valuable source on the material culture and spiritual life of the Paleolithic humans. The cave is also the only Gravettian find in the west Balkans and one of the richest and most important finds of the Upper Paleolithic in the Southeast Europe. A technological and typological analysis of the discovered materials, numerous stone artifacts and fauna remnants, and the subsequent accelerator mass spectrometry method, established that the cave was already inhabited in the Middle Paleolithic, 38,000 years ago. Materials discovered in the chronologically younger layers belong to the major Upper Paleolithic cultures of Europe, Aurignacian (31,000 years ago) and Gravettian (25,000 years ago).

A cave was still used for dwelling by the local population in the 4th century and then again from 12th to 15th century.

References

Populated places in Kolubara District
Caves of Serbia
Archaeological sites in Serbia
Paleolithic
Protected areas of Serbia